Mers may refer to:

 MERS, Middle East respiratory syndrome
 Middle East respiratory syndrome–related coronavirus (MERS-CoV), the virus that causes MERS
 El Mers, a town in Morocco
 Mer (community) or Maher community, an Indian social group
 Mers-les-Bains, a town in France
 Mortgage Electronic Registration Systems, an American company

See also

 Metro Ethernet Routing Switch 8600 (MERS 8600)
 
 
 
 Middle East respiratory syndrome outbreak (disambiguation)
 Mer (disambiguation)
 Merz (disambiguation)
 Murs (disambiguation)